This is a list of the seasons the Flames played in Atlanta. For season history after the team relocated, see List of Calgary Flames seasons.
This is a list of seasons completed by the Atlanta Flames of the National Hockey League. This list documents the records and playoff results for all eight seasons that the Atlanta Flames have completed in the NHL before their relocation to Calgary, Alberta in 1980. Atlanta would be left without an NHL franchise for 19 years. The Atlanta Thrashers were founded as an expansion team in 1999; however, the Thrashers would subsequently relocate to Winnipeg, Manitoba in 2011, becoming the current incarnation of the Winnipeg Jets, again leaving Atlanta without an NHL franchise.

Table key

Season-by-season history

See also
List of Calgary Flames seasons
List of Atlanta Thrashers seasons

References

2007–08 Calgary Flames Media Guide, pg. 105

National Hockey League team seasons
Atlanta Flames
seasons